Paola Laura Ruggeri Ghigo (born July 14, 1961 in Caracas, Venezuela) is Miss Venezuela 1983. She placed 7th in Miss Universe 1983 as the only Latin American among the Top 12 semifinalists.

Miss Venezuela
Ruggeri competed in 1983 as Miss Portuguesa in her country's national beauty pageant, Miss Venezuela, capturing the crown and the right to represent her country in Miss Universe 1983.

Miss Universe
As the official representative of her country to the 1983 Miss Universe pageant held in St. Louis, Missouri on July 11, 1983, she was the only Latin American contestant in the semifinals, won the preliminary swimsuit competition and placed third in the semifinal evening gown competition, placing 7th overall.

Career 
Ruggeri is also an Olympic Swimmer and keeps active as a Professional Swimmer.

She Participated in the 1976 Summer Olympics

References
2. https://www.olympic.org/paola-ruggieri

3.  Evans, Hilary; Gjerde, Arild; Heijmans, Jeroen; Mallon, Bill. Paola Ruggeri Olympic Result . Olympics at Sports-Reference.com. Sports Reference LLC.

External links
Miss Venezuela Official Website
Miss Universe Official Website
Olympic 
Paola Ruggieri at Sports Reference

 

1961 births
Living people
Miss Universe 1983 contestants
Miss Venezuela winners
People from Caracas